Dane Jacomen (born February 25, 2001) is an American soccer player who plays as a goalkeeper for Loudoun United in the USL Championship.

Career

Youth, College & Amateur
Jacomen attended Taylor Allderdice High School, where he was a three-year letter winner. He also played club soccer as part of the Pittsburgh Riverhounds academy from 2014, before earning a move to the D.C. United academy in 2017.

In 2018, Jacomen went to the University of Pennsylvania to play college soccer. In three seasons with the Quakers, Jacomen went on to make 24 appearances. In 2019, he was named Philadelphia Soccer Six All-Star and Philadelphia Soccer Six All-Rookie.

While at college, Jacomen played in the USL League Two with Evergreen FC in 2019 and West Chester United in 2021. Having only conceded five goals in 13 games for West Chester in 2021, Jacomen earned the USL League Two  Golden Glove Award.

Professional
With the 2020 collegiate season at Penn cancelled due to the COVID-19 pandemic, Jacomen was eligible for another season of college soccer, but opted to forego that season to pursue a professional career. On May 25, 2022, Jacomen signed with USL Championship side Loudoun United. He made a short-term loan move to USL League One club Charlotte Independence on June 17, 2022, going on to make two appearances for them.

Honors

Individual
West Chester United SC
USL League Two Golden Gloves Award: 2021

References

External links 
 Dan Jacomen at Penn Athletics

2001 births
Living people
American soccer players
Association football defenders
Charlotte Independence players
Loudoun United FC players
Penn Quakers men's soccer players
Soccer players from Pennsylvania
Sportspeople from Pittsburgh
USL Championship players
USL League One players
USL League Two players